Pirjo Ruotsalainen (born 24 November 1944 in Viipurin maalaiskunta) is a Finnish orienteering competitor. She received a silver medal in the relay event at the 1966 World Orienteering Championships in Fiskars together with 
Anja Meldo and Raila Hovi.

See also
 Finnish orienteers
 List of orienteers
 List of orienteering events

References

1944 births
Living people
Finnish orienteers
Female orienteers
Foot orienteers
World Orienteering Championships medalists